Kazbegi is a district of Georgia, in the region of Mtskheta-Mtianeti in east-north Georgia.

The main settlement is Stepantsminda, accounting for about half of the total population.

Kazbegi Municipality is situated in the upper valley of the Terek River, which goes on to traverse the Georgia–Russia border to the north and eventually drains into the Caspian Sea in Dagestan, Russian Federation. By the conventional definition of the Europe-Asia boundary as following the watershed of the Greater Caucasus, Kazbegi Municipality geographically is European part of Georgia.

Landmarks
Kazbegi Municipality is known for its scenic location in the Greater Caucasus mountains, and it is a center for trekkers and mountain climbing. Local attractions include the Kazbegi Museum and Ethnographic Museum in town, and the Gergeti Trinity Church outside of town, as well as Mount Kazbegi itself and the alpine meadows and forests of the surrounding Kazbegi Nature Reserve, Juta mountain, Gveleti Waterfall, Truso valley and Abudelauri blue lakes.

Attractions and sport facilities 

  Horse-riding
  Paragliding
  Bike-riding
  Gergeti Sameba Church
  Natural mineral waters
  Mount Kazbek climbing
  Glaciers
 Waterfall Gveleti

Politics
Kazbegi Municipal Assembly (Georgian: ყაზბეგის საკრებულო) is a representative body in Kazbegi Municipality. currently consisting of 18 members. The council is assembles into session regularly, to consider subject matters such as code changes, utilities, taxes, city budget, oversight of city government and more. Kazbegi sakrebulo is elected every four year. The last election was held in October 2021.

Municipal Assembly 2017-2021

See also 
 List of municipalities in Georgia (country)

Notes

References

External links 
 Districts of Georgia, Statoids.com

Municipalities of Mtskheta-Mtianeti